The Silala or Siloli is an international river arising from springs in Bolivia, and flowing naturally into Chile.

The division of the flow from this water body was a matter of controversy between the two nations, Chile claiming that the present route makes it an international river, while Bolivia denied there was a river and asserted that the Silala ‘springs’ would not flow to Chile if not for the construction of canals over a hundred years ago. In 2016 Chile demanded Bolivia in the International Court of Justice, in the countermemory, Bolivia recognized the water body as a river, redicing the controversy to artificial infraestructure in the place which would give a 30% more water to Chile. Finally in 2022 the Court ruled that the water body is in fact a river and that Chile has an equitable and reasonable right to use the waters of it.

See also
Dispute over the Status and Use of the Waters of the Silala

References
Notes

Sources
 EVALUACION DE LOS RECURSOS HIDRICOS SUPERFICIALES EN LA CUENCA DEL RIO BIO BIO (PDF)

Rivers of Chile
Rivers of Bolivia
Rivers of Antofagasta Region
Rivers of Potosí Department
International rivers of South America